The Canadian electro-industrial band Skinny Puppy has recorded many original songs, remixes, demos, outtakes, and improvisations. They appear listed below.

Studio songs and in-house remixes

Studio improvisations, demos, and outtakes

Live improvisations and songs

References

Notes

Sources

External links
Skinny Puppy songs at AllMusic

Skinny Puppy